Maniliz Segarra (born 27 February 1966) is a Puerto Rican judoka. She competed in the women's lightweight event at the 1992 Summer Olympics.

References

1966 births
Living people
Puerto Rican female judoka
Olympic judoka of Puerto Rico
Judoka at the 1992 Summer Olympics
Place of birth missing (living people)
Pan American Games medalists in judo
Pan American Games bronze medalists for Puerto Rico
Judoka at the 1991 Pan American Games
Medalists at the 1991 Pan American Games
20th-century Puerto Rican women